The Polizia Ferroviaria are the branch of the Italian Polizia di Stato responsible for policing the Italian state railways, the  Ferrovie dello Stato.

See also
Transit police

References

External links

Official website (Italian)

Polizia di Stato
Railroad police agencies

de:Bahnpolizei
it:Polizia ferroviaria